Walter William Anderson (July 13, 1936 – April 18, 2017) was an American football tight end in the National Football League for the Washington Redskins and the Green Bay Packers. He played high school football at Manatee High School in Bradenton, Florida and college football at the University of Tennessee.  He was drafted in the third round of the 1958 NFL Draft.

Washington
Anderson played for the Redskins from 1958 to 1963.  He was selected by the team as Rookie of the Year in 1958 and Player of the Year in 1959.  Bill made 178 catches, averaging 17.1 yards per catch, and scored 14 touchdowns over six seasons.  Anderson was a two-time Pro Bowl selection (1959 and 1960).

Comeback with Green Bay
Anderson retired from football in 1963 and joined the Tennessee staff as an assistant coach.  However, he temporarily put his retirement plans on hold and signed with the Green Bay Packers in 1965.  He played 24 games with Green Bay from 1965–1966 and averaged 11.9 yards per catch. The comeback was a good thing for him as the Packers won the 1965 and 1966 NFL Championships and he subsequently earned a Super Bowl ring when the Packers defeated the Kansas City Chiefs to win Super Bowl I on January 15, 1967.

Broadcasting
In 1968, Anderson returned to Tennessee as color analyst for football games on the Vol Network, partnered with play-by-play announcer John Ward. Ward and Anderson would remain together for 31 years, the longest-running broadcast partnership in college football at the time.  Their final game was the 1998 national championship game, the first game of the Bowl Championship Series, won by Tennessee over Florida State University.

Family
Anderson is the second cousin of Giant Bomb staff member Brad Shoemaker.

Death
Anderson died on April 18, 2017, at a hospital in Knoxville, Tennessee, at the age of 80.

References

External links
 

1936 births
2017 deaths
American football ends
American football tight ends
Green Bay Packers players
Tennessee Volunteers football announcers
Tennessee Volunteers football players
Washington Redskins players
Eastern Conference Pro Bowl players
People from Hendersonville, North Carolina